The Lyutenge (Lüüteŋke, obsolete "Люютэнкэ") is a river in the Sakha Republic, Russia.

There are unusual rock formations by the river, the Turuuk Khaya Rocks, a protected area.

Course
The river begins in the Byldanyany Lake, a small lake with a surface of  located in the Lena Plateau. Its upper course is in the southern part of Khangalassky District close to the A360 Lena Highway, not far from Aldan District. It flows roughly southeastwards.

The Lyutenge River freezes between October and May. The main tributaries of the Lyutenge are the Kuon Kachah, Berdigasteheh, Kedige (Ulakhan-Kuudaly), Kuraanakh, Eselaheh and Kuuduman.

See also
Amur–Yakutsk Mainline
List of rivers of Russia

References

External links

 Geography - Yakutia Organized

Rivers of the Sakha Republic